Pseudopomatias is a genus of land snails in the subfamily Pupinellinae of the family Pupinidae in the superfamily Cyclophoroidea (according to the taxonomy of the Gastropoda by Bouchet & Rocroi, 2005).

Species
 Pseudopomatias abletti Páll-Gergely, 2015
 Pseudopomatias amoenus Möllendorff, 1885
 Pseudopomatias barnai E. Gittenberger & Leda, 2019
 Pseudopomatias caligosus Páll-Gergely & Hunyadi, 2018
 Pseudopomatias eos Pilsbry & Hirase, 1905
 Pseudopomatias franzhuberi Thach, 2020
 Pseudopomatias harli Páll-Gergely, 2015
 Pseudopomatias himalayae (Benson, 1859)
 Pseudopomatias linanprietoae Páll-Gergely, 2015
 † Pseudopomatias lyui (T. T. Yu, B. Wang & Jarzembowski, 2019) 
 Pseudopomatias maasseni Páll-Gergely & Hunyadi, 2015
 Pseudopomatias nitens Páll-Gergely, 2015
 Pseudopomatias peguensis (Theobald, 1864)
 Pseudopomatias phrunoi Páll-Gergely & Grego, 2019
 Pseudopomatias pleurophorus (Benson, 1857)
 Pseudopomatias prestoni Páll-Gergely, 2015
 Pseudopomatias reischuetzi Páll-Gergely, 2015
 Pseudopomatias shanensis Páll-Gergely, 2015
 Pseudopomatias siyomensis Godwin-Austen, 1917
 Pseudopomatias sophiae Páll-Gergely, 2015
 † Pseudopomatias zhuoi (T. T. Yu, B. Wang & Jarzembowski, 2019)
Synonyms
 Pseudopomatias fulvus Möllendorff, 1901: synonym of Pseudopomatias amoenus Möllendorff, 1885
 Pseudopomatias grandis (Godwin-Austen, 1876): synonym of Csomapupa grandis (Godwin-Austen, 1876) (unaccepted combination)
 Pseudopomatias luyorensis Godwin-Austen, 1917: synonym of Csomapupa luyorensis (Godwin-Austen, 1917) (original combination)

References

 Mabille, J. (1889). Contributions à la faune macalogique [sic] du Tonkin. A. Masson, Meulan. 20 pp.

External links
 Möllendorff, O. F. von. (1885). Diagnoses specierum novarum sinensium. Nachrichtsblatt der Deutschen Malakozoologischen Gesellschaft. 17(11-12): 161–170
 https://www.biodiversitylibrary.org/page/16071187 Heude, P.M. (1886-1887). Diagnoses molluscorum novorum, in Sinis collectorum (1). Journal de Conchyliologie. 34(3): 208-215 [4 November 1886; 34(4): 296-302]
 Páll-Gergely B., Fehér Z., Hunyadi A. & Asami T. (2015). Revision of the genus Pseudopomatias and its relatives (Gastropoda: Cyclophoroidea: Pupinidae). Zootaxa. 3937(1): 1-49

Pupinidae